Ivana Kirilenko (born 21 June 2000) is a Croatian footballer who plays as a forward for ŽNK Split and the Croatia women's national team.

Club career
In 2020, Kirilenko played for Split in the UEFA Women's Champions League.

International career
Kirilenko was capped for Croatia at senior level during the UEFA Women's Euro 2022 qualifying.

References

2000 births
Living people
Croatian women's footballers
Women's association football forwards
ŽNK Split players
ŽNK Mura players
Croatia women's international footballers
Croatian expatriate women's footballers
Croatian expatriate sportspeople in Slovenia
Expatriate women's footballers in Slovenia
Croatian people of Ukrainian descent